Eagle Farm railway station is an abandoned passenger station on the Pinkenba railway line, only  (4.2 mi) from the Brisbane central business district;  from Central station by rail.

History
Opened in 1952 as Baraini railway station, it was renamed a few months later to Airport railway station since it was located near the old Brisbane Airport at Eagle Farm before it moved to its current location, north, at the demolished suburb Cribb Island. Airport station was unpopular with airport passengers, mostly due to very infrequent services and significant walking distance to the airport terminal. It was renamed Eagle Farm railway station in 1988 along with the electrification of the line, only until a few metres past the station.

All passenger services on the line were suspended on 27 September 1993 by the Goss Labor Party state government rationalisation of the rail network throughout Queensland, with the suspending or closing of unprofitable and under-utilised rail lines.

In 1998 the line re-opened to passenger services, but only operated as far as Doomben, the station immediately prior, with connecting bus services to the former railway stations between Doomben and Pinkenba.

Current status
The Eagle Farm railway station building was demolished in early 2012.

Replacement bus service
The bus stop for the replacement TransLink bus service (303) is near Eagle Farm station in Kingsford Smith Drive.

Original Eagle Farm station

The original Eagle Farm railway station opened in 1897 just 90 metres past Airport, west of the corner of Want Street and Schneider Road, behind the Ford Motor Company of Australia site, today home of G. James glass.  It closed in 1977 with the opening of Whinstanes-Doomben station.

See also
Queensland Rail City network
TransLink (Queensland)

References

Disused railway stations in Brisbane
Railway stations in Australia opened in 1952
Railway stations closed in 1993